12th ZAI Awards

Presenter  Union of Authors and Performers 

Hall of Fame Pavol Zelenay

◄ 11th │ 13th ►

The 12th ZAI Awards, honoring the best in the Slovak music industry for individual achievements for the year of 2011, took time and place on April 26, 2012 at the Hotel Crowne Plaza in Bratislava. The annual ceremony hosted Martin Sarvaš, the chairman of the ZAI organization.

Winners and nominees

Main categories

Others

References

External links
 ZAI Awards > Winners (Official site)
 ZAI Awards > 2011 Winners (by TASR)

12
2011 music awards